Kingdom Come is a 2001 American comedy-drama film, written by David Dean Bottrell and Jessie Jones, and directed by Doug McHenry.  This film stars LL Cool J, Jada Pinkett Smith, Vivica A. Fox, Anthony Anderson, Toni Braxton, Whoopi Goldberg, Loretta Devine, and Darius McCrary.

Plot
Kingdom Come is a story of a family called the Slocumbs, living out in the country, who must come together after the death of a family member, whom no one seems to remember with much fondness. It is based on the Off-Broadway play Dearly Departed.

First, there's Woodrow "Bud" Slocumb, the man in question, whose wife, Raynelle (Whoopi Goldberg), is pretty nonchalant about his death from a stroke. Then, there's Ray Bud (LL Cool J), a recovering alcoholic who has a problem with seeing his father dead because of their rocky relationship; his wife, Lucille (Vivica A. Fox), is a loving, devoted housewife who goes out of her way to make sure that everyone has everything they need, but can't have the one thing she wants out of life: a child. Next, Junior (Anthony Anderson) has blown all of his money on a failed invention, and his loud mouthed wife, Charisse (Jada Pinkett Smith), is no help; she hits the roof after his infidelity and reminds him often that she could have been married to his rich lawyer cousin, who, it is later revealed, left his own wife Juanita (Toni Braxton). Then, there's Marguerite (Loretta Devine), a pious, overbearing mother who usually calls her wayward son, Royce (Darius McCrary), a "Demon Seed"; she fears that he will end up in jail like his brother, and the latter is an unemployed worker who is irritated by his mother's unsolicited and shrill advice on how to live his life.

Cast
 LL Cool J as Raymond "Ray" Bud Slocumb
 Jada Pinkett Smith as Charisse Slocumb
 Vivica A. Fox as Lucille Slocumb
 Loretta Devine as Marguerite Slocumb
 Anthony Anderson as Junior Slocumb
 Toni Braxton as Juanita Slocumb
 Cedric the Entertainer as Rev. Beverly H. Hooker
 Darius McCrary as Royce Slocumb
 Whoopi Goldberg as Raynelle Slocumb
 Richard Gant as Clyde Kincaid
 Kellita Smith as Bernice Talbot
 Clifton Davis as Charles Winslow
 Masasa Moyo as Delightful Slocumb
 Dominic Hoffman as Antoine Depew
 Ellis E. Williams as Woodrow "Bud" Slocumb (uncredited)

Awards and nominations
 
 In 2002, received a NAACP Image Award nomination for "Outstanding Actress" for Whoopi Goldberg; "Outstanding Supporting Actor" for Cedric the Entertainer; "Outstanding Supporting Actress" for Loretta Devine; and "Outstanding Supporting Actress" for Vivica A. Fox.

Soundtrack
 
 "Kingdom Come" - Written by Kirk Franklin
 Performed by Kirk Franklin and Jill Scott
 Produced by Kirk Franklin for Fo Yo Soul Productions/B-Rite Music
 Kirk Franklin appears courtesy of GospoCentric Records
 Jill Scott appears courtesy of Hidden Beach Recordings
 "Blessed Assurance Jesus Is Mine" - Written by Fannie Crosby and Joseph Knapp
 Performed by Loretta Devine
 "It's Alright" - Written by Kirk Franklin
 Performed by Trin-i-tee 5:7
 Produced by Kirk Franklin for Fo Yo Soul Productions/B-Rite Music
 Trin-i-tee 5:7 appears courtesy of B-Rite Music
 "Someday" - Written by Kirk Franklin
 Performed by Crystal Lewis
 Produced by Kirk Franklin for Fo Yo Soul Productions/B-Rite Music
 Crystal Lewis appears courtesy of Metro One Records
 "Help Lord (Won't You Come)" - Written by Stanley Burrell, Ontario Haynes, Maurice Stewart and John Rhone
 Performed by MC Hammer 
 Courtesy of Giant Records
 By Arrangement with Warner Special Products
 Produced by The Whole 9
 "Just a Closer Walk With Thee" - Traditional
 Performed by Bobby Jones and the Nashville Super Choir
 Courtesy of GospoCentric Records
 "Every Woman" - Written by Kirk Franklin
 Performed by Az Yet
 Produced by Kirk Franklin for Fo Yo Soul Productions/B-Rite Music
 "Stand" - Written by Kirk Franklin
 Performed by Shawn Stockman
 Produced by Kirk Franklin for Fo Yo Soul Productions/B-Rite Music
 Shawn Stockman appears courtesy of Universal Records
 "God's Got It All In Control" - Written by Kurt Carr
 Performed by Kurt Carr and friends featuring Tamela Mann from The Family
 Produced by Kurt Carr for Kurt Carr Productions/GospoCentric Records
 Kurt Carr, Yvette Williams and Tamela Mann appear courtesy of GospoCentric Records
 "Just a Closer Walk With Thee" - Traditional
 "It Is Well With My Soul" - Written by Horatio Spafford and Philip Bliss
 "Amazing Grace" - Written by John Newton
 "Thy Will Be Done" - Written by Kirk Franklin
 Performed by Deborah Cox
 Produced by Kirk Franklin for Fo Yo Soul Productions/B-Rite Music
 Deborah Cox appears courtesy of J Records LLC
 "Daddy's Song" - Written by Kirk Franklin
 Performed by Carl Thomas, Natalie Wilson and SOP
 Produced by Kirk Franklin for Fo Yo Soul Productions/B-Rite Music
 Carl Thomas appears courtesy of Bad Boy Records
 Natalie Wilson and SOP appear courtesy of GospoCentric Records
 "Try Me" - Written by Kirk Franklin
 Performed by the cast with Ashley Guilbert, Shanika Leeks and Candy West
 "Try Me" - Written by Kirk Franklin
 Performed by Tamar Braxton and One Nation Crew
 Produced by Kirk Franklin for Fo Yo Soul Productions/B-Rite Music
 Tamar Braxton appears courtesy of DreamWorks Records
 One Nation Crew appears courtesy of B-Rite Music
 "Thank You" - Written by Kirk Franklin
 Performed by Kirk Franklin and Mary Mary
 Produced by Kirk Franklin for Fo Yo Soul Productions/B-Rite Music
 Mary Mary appears courtesy of Columbia Records
 Kirk Franklin appears courtesy of GospoCentric Records

References

External links
 
 
 https://www.imdb.com/title/tt0246002/soundtrack

2001 films
2001 comedy-drama films
American comedy-drama films
Films about alcoholism
Films scored by Tyler Bates
Columbia Pictures films
2000s English-language films
2000s American films